The Embraer Legacy 600 is a business jet derivative of the Embraer ERJ 145 family of commercial jet aircraft.

Design and development

The Legacy 600 (market designation adopted after 2005) is based on the ERJ-135 model. It was launched in 2000 at the Farnborough Airshow as the "Legacy 2000". It features added range via extra fuel tanks in the tail behind the baggage compartment and forward of the wing, winglets, and an extensive drag reduction program. It is certified to  altitude versus  for the airline configuration. The Legacy Shuttle can seat 19 to 37 in airline-style seats but without the range.

The first flight was made in June 2000, with the prototype of the ERJ-135 (PT-ZJA). This same aircraft was once the prototype of the first ERJ-145. New winglets and new wing-to-fuselage fairing was added, but no additional fuel tanks were available. The new fuselage fuel tanks were ready for the second prototype (PT-XJO), along with engine and avionics, that flew only in March 31st 2001. It was the second Embraer model to feature winglets, as the first were installed on the EMB-145SA military model. Embraer winglet models differed in shape and structure, due to their optimum design speed. 

The Legacy 600 competes on the upper end of the small to mid-sized range of business jets and is considered a "Heavy Jet" aircraft.  It has nearly the opposite design progression as the rival Canadair Challenger.  The Legacy 600 was derived from the established ERJ family of regional jets, while the Canadair Regional Jet was developed by Bombardier from the Challenger business jet.  Both lines of aircraft are competitors.  Embraer has since launched an extensive lineup of business aircraft, from the entry-level Phenom 100 to the Lineage 1000, a bizliner version of the company's 100-seat E190.

With the updated Mark I cockpit of the EMB-145, the Legacy includes a Honeywell Primus Elite avionics suite glass cockpit.

U.S. private aviation companies offering Legacy 600-family business jets for charter include Embraer Executive Jet Services, Clay Lacy Aviation, ExcelAire, Aircraft Services Group and Jet Edge International.

Legacy 650
Announced at the 2009 NBAA show, the Legacy 650 is a longer-range version of the Legacy 600, giving it a range capability of 7,220 km (3,900 nmi) non-stop with four passengers, or carry 1,134 kg more than the 600 for a 6,290 km trip. It features also a lowered alley, with increased headroom. It was certified by the FAA in February 2011.

Embraer had a joint venture with Aviation Industry Corp. in China assembling Legacy 650a and ERJ-145s from 2004 to 2016.

An enhanced version, the 650E, was announced at the 2016 NBAA and scheduled for introduction in 2017. It includes a synthetic vision system and autothrottle as standard, a restyled three-zone interior and comes with a 10-year or 10,000-flight-hour warranty. In August 2020 Embraer announced that it was stopping sales of the Legacy 650.

Accident and incidents

On 29 September 2006, an ExcelAire Legacy (registered N600XL) collided with Gol Transportes Aéreos Flight 1907 Boeing 737 while cruising over the northern state of Mato Grosso, Brazil. The Boeing crashed to the ground and all 154 passengers and crew were killed, while the Embraer jet, despite serious damage to the left horizontal stabilizer and left winglet, was able to continue flying and managed to land at a Brazilian military airfield (Cachimbo Air Force Base).

Aircraft deliveries

Specifications

See also

References

External links

 
 
 
 Embraer Legacy 650 Private Jets

2000s Brazilian business aircraft
Embraer aircraft
T-tail aircraft
Twinjets
Aircraft first flown in 2001
Low-wing aircraft